Skoal Pacific Bell #14 (April 1, 1981 – 1993) was a bucking bull best known for being the only three-time consecutive Professional Rodeo Cowboys Association (PRCA) Bucking Bull of the Year (1988 - 1990) and for only being ridden 5 times in 150 attempts. In 2007, he was inducted into the ProRodeo Hall of Fame. , he was the seventh and most recent bull so honored. The PRCA said in an official YouTube induction video that "Skoal Pacific Bell was a crowd pleaser and a cowboy challenger."

Background 
Pacific Bell was born in 1981. he was a dark tan/black color with a big white face. Raised and owned throughout his career by stock contractor Dan Russell, Pacific Bell was born and raised on the Russell Ranch in Folsom, California. He earned his name at age 4 after he began bucking and Russell noticed that "he liked to throw back his head while bucking as if he wanted to reach out and touch someone."

Russell had a significant impact in the sport of bull riding. Dan owned and operated Western Rodeos, Inc., which he inherited from his father. The Russell family had been involved in the cattle industry since the Civil War. The co-founders of the Professional Bull Riders (PBR) rode Russell's stock throughout the 1980s and 90s. Bullfighters for the PBR and PRCA such as Rob Smets, Shorty Gorham, and Joe Baumgartner started their careers working at events in California where Russell provided stock. Russell was particularly well-remembered for his involvement with rodeo in Salinas, California. Since 2002, he lived with his wife Linda in Henryetta, Oklahoma. Danny, his son, is also a stock contractor.

Like the undefeated PRCA bull Red Rock, undefeated PBR bull Mick E. Mouse, barely ridden PBR bull Bushwacker and other such famous bulls, Pacific Bell showed that he had no set bucking pattern. The bull would toss his head side to side and could jump extremely high. His bucking abilities made it extremely difficult for cowboys to determine what the bull was going to do and get a qualified ride from him.

Career 
At the age of four, Pacific Bell began to buck. As his career progressed, he became sponsored by the Skoal tobacco company, thus becoming known as Skoal Pacific Bell. He became the top bull at the 1987 National Finals Rodeo (NFR) for bucking off Rickey Lindsey and Dale Johansen. While the bull was part of the PRCA circuit, he bucked off cowboy after cowboy, including many of the best bull riders of the time. These included 1987 PRCA World Champion Lane Frost, who was the only cowboy to ride 1987 Bucking Bull of the Year Red Rock (which he did after Red Rock's retirement, in the Challenge of the Champions). Then came three-time world champion and rider of "the most dangerous bull ever" Bodacious, Tuff Hedeman. Skoal Pacific Bell also bucked off "King of the Cowboys" Ty Murray. At the 1988 NFR, future World Champion Jim Sharp logged an 85 point ride on Skoal Pacific Bell. It paved the way for one of Sharp's two PRCA world championships. "He’s a bull that’s quick and kicks really high and spins real fast,” Sharp later told reporters. “He just bucks hard. It’s a combination of everything that makes him so good. He does it all.” Skoal Pacific Bell also bucked off 1982 PRCA World Champion Charles Sampson and future PBR World Champion Michael Gaffney. World Champion Ted Nuce was awarded 83 points on him at the 1988 NFR.

At the 1991 NFR, future PBR World Champion Troy Dunn rode him for 91 points. Then in February 1993, Skoal Pacific Bell gave 1992 PRCA World Champion Cody Custer a concussion and a laceration to his chin at Bullnanza in Guthrie, Oklahoma. At the 1993 Bull Riders Only (BRO) World Championship in Long Beach, California, he was successfully ridden in the Championship Round by Buddy Gulden for 81 points. This was Skoal Pacific Bell’s last known professional out.

Death and legacy
Skoal Pacific Bell died in late 1993. The bull never lived to see his 2007 induction into the hall of fame. Russell died on December 29, 2013 of a heart attack at age 61 in his home near Henryetta, Oklahoma. He was known for raising and owning many champion bulls in the PRCA, including Trick or Treat, Pacific Bell, and Grasshopper, the last two of whom won the PRCA Bucking Bull of the Year title at least once.

Honors 
 Selected as the top bull at the 1987 Nationals Finals Rodeo†
 1988 PRCA Bucking Bull of the Year award decided by vote of top 30 bull riders
 1989 PRCA Bucking Bull of the Year 
 1990 PRCA Bucking Bull of the Year
 Only bull to win PRCA Bucking Bull of the Year award three times in a row
 Inducted into the ProRodeo Hall of Fame in 2007

†Red Rock won Bucking Bull of the Year in 1987

References

External links
 Skoal Pacific Bell (2007 Hall of Fame Inductee) Official PRCA YouTube video
 Pacific Bell 1988 NFR Ted Nuce.MP4 YouTube Video
 Skoal Pacific Bell vs Charles Sampson - 90 Rodeo Salinas YouTube video

Individual bulls in sport
Bucking bulls
ProRodeo Hall of Fame inductees